Martine Bartlett (April 24, 1925 – April 5, 2006) was an American actress. A life member of The Actors Studio, Bartlett is best-remembered, albeit not by name, for her chilling performance as Hattie Dorsett, the seriously disturbed, abusive mother of Sally Field's title character in Sybil.

Career
She was active onstage with the former St. Louis Community Playhouse, Rooftop Players and the old Empress Theater. She received her master's degree at the Graduate Drama School at Yale. Her debut on Broadway was as a townsperson in The Devil's Disciple (1950). She was part of the ensemble cast in Saint Joan (1951), starring Uta Hagen.

Her first television appearance was in an episode of Robert Montgomery Presents titled "The Man Who Vanished" (1956). Her other appearances include episodes on The Twilight Zone, The Fugitive, Dr. Kildare, The Virginian, Kojak, Cannon, Mission: Impossible, and Quincy, M.E. She was nominated for an Emmy Award for Outstanding Performance in a Supporting Role by an Actress for her performance in an episode of the series Arrest and Trial ("Journey Into Darkness", 1963).

She returned to Broadway in 1957 and played the role as Loreena Lovejoy in Carson McCullers' The Square Root of Wonderful (starring Anne Baxter). Bartlett appeared as the kindly Aunt Nonnie in the original Broadway production of Tennessee Williams' Sweet Bird of Youth (1959).

Her motion picture debut was as the English teacher Miss Metcalf in Splendor in the Grass (1961), starring Natalie Wood and Warren Beatty. Other films in which she appeared include The Prize (1963) and Lord Love a Duck (1966). She played Alma Mulloy, the first victim of Rod Steiger's serial killer in No Way to Treat a Lady (1968). She played the delusional prostitute Sadie in Fuzz (1972); played Raquel Welch's mother (and Jodie Foster's grandmother) in Kansas City Bomber (1972); and appeared in Aloha, Bobby and Rose (1975).

Bartlett portrayed the "Secret Wife", a self-abusing mental patient, in I Never Promised You a Rose Garden (1977). In the NBC miniseries Sybil (1976), Bartlett played Hattie Dorsett, Sybil's psychotic mother who appears in flashbacks abusing and tormenting a very young Sybil (played by Natasha Ryan), garnering acclaim for her performance. She made her last known appearance in an episode of the television series Remington Steele (1983).

Death
Bartlett died on April 5, 2006, in Tempe, Arizona, aged 80. She is buried in Calvary Cemetery in St. Louis, Missouri.

Filmography

Film

Television

References

External links

MSN Movies entry for Martine Bartlett
TVGuide.com entry for Martine Bartlett

1925 births
2006 deaths
20th-century American actresses
Actresses from St. Louis
American film actresses
American stage actresses
American television actresses
Deaths from kidney failure
Washington University in St. Louis alumni
Yale School of Drama alumni